Spencer Cotie (born 18 April 1999) is an Australian boccia player. He represented Australia at the 2020 Tokyo Paralympics.

Early life 
He was born on 18 April 1999 with cerebral palsy. He is unable to walk or speak and communicates through typing on an iPad. He attended Killarney Heights High School and is studying a Bachelor of Laws at Macquarie University.

Boccia 

Cotie first represented Australia in 2014 at the BISFed World Open in Hong Kong, where he and Daniel Michel won the silver medal in the mixed pairs BC3. In 2017, he won the bronze medal in the mixed singles BC3 at the 2017 BISFed Regional Open Championships in Dubai, UAE.

Cotie and Michel won the silver medal in the mixed pairs BC3 at the 2018 BISFed World Boccia Championships in Liverpool, England. At the end of 2018, Cotie and Michel were ranked world number three.

At the 2020 Tokyo Paralympics, Cotie in the Mixed Individual BC3 Pool Matches beat Stefania Ferrando of Argentine 4-1 and then also beat Jamie McCowan of Great Britain 5-2. He then lost to Scott McCowan 4-3. In spite of winning two out of three matches he was still eliminated and failed to qualify for the quarter-finals. He teamed with Daniel Michel and Jamieson Leeson in the Mixed Pairs BC3, where they won 2 and lost 2 matches but failed to qualify for the quarter-finals.

References

External links 
 

1999 births
Living people
Boccia players at the 2020 Summer Paralympics
Paralympic boccia players of Australia
Sportspeople with cerebral palsy